The Cowboys  is a short-lived Western television series based on the 1972 motion picture of the same name. It aired on the American Broadcasting Company (ABC) television network from February 6 to June 27, 1974. The television show starred Jim Davis, Diana Douglas, Moses Gunn, A Martinez, Robert Carradine, and Clay O'Brien. David Dortort, best known for Bonanza and The High Chaparral, produced the series. The television show followed the exploits of seven boys who worked on a ranch in 1870s New Mexico.

The Cowboys was conceived as an hour-long series, but ABC decided to reduce the running time to a half-hour format. The format change did not lead to increased viewers, and the show was the victim of early cancellation. As a traditional television Western, it was an aberration compared to most television trends of the 1970s (as most had ended production several years prior and only Gunsmoke was still in production by then).

Guest stars included Cal Bellini as Wa-Cha-Ka in "The Indian Givers", Kevin Hagen as Josh Redding in "Death on a Fast Horse", and Lurene Tuttle as Grandma Jesse in "Many a Good Horse Died".

Cast
Diana Douglas as Annie Andersen 
Jim Davis as Marshal Bill Winter
Moses Gunn as Jebediah Nightlinger  
A Martinez as Cimarron (Cowboy)
Robert Carradine as Slim (Cowboy)
Sean Kelly as Jimmy (Cowboy)
Kerry MacLane as Homer (Cowboy)
Clint Howard as Steve (Cowboy) 
Mitch Brown as Hardy (Cowboy)
Clay O'Brien as Weedy (Cowboy)

Guest stars
Each guest star made only one appearance.

Ted Gehring as Eben Graff
DeForest Kelley as Jack Potter
Cal Bellini as Wa-Cha-Ka  
Kevin Hagen as Josh Redding 
Lurene Tuttle as Grandma Jesse  
Stafford Repp as Army Captain
Ian Wolfe as Padre 
John McKee as Foley
Walter Brooke as Reager  
John Carradine as Oscar Schmidt
Jack Perkins 
Pippa Scott as Chief

External links 
 

1970s Western (genre) television series
American Broadcasting Company original programming
1974 American television series debuts
1974 American television series endings
Television series by Warner Bros. Television Studios
Television shows set in New Mexico